Sardoi is a village in Modasa, Taluka in the Aravalli district of Gujarat state in India. It is located 34.8 km from Himmatnagar and 93.6 km from Gandhinagar, the capital of Gujarat.

Location
The nearby villages include Davli, which is approximately 4 km away; Sajapur-Tintisar, which is approximately 1 km away; Bolundra, which is approximately 6 km away; Gadhada, which is approximately 6 km away; and Rajendranagar, which is approximately 6 km away.  Sardoi Village is bounded as follows:
North: Bhiloda Taluka;
East: Meghraj Taluka;
South: Dhansura Taluka;
West: Himmatnagar Taluka.

Demographics
The total population of Sardoi village as per the last census is 3079, which includes 1550 males and 1529 females.

Places of interest
The village has a Chamunda Matajai Temple, a Brahmani Mataji Temple, a Shivji Temple, a Harshdi Mataji Temple, a Digambar Jain Temple and a Shwetambar Jain Temple. There is one Gayatri Ashram as well. At the entrance of the village is the Bahucharmata Temple, and behind that is the Jagannath Bhagwan temple in Shandilya Ashram.

References

Villages in Aravalli district